The rope-a-dope is a boxing fighting technique in which one contender leans against the ropes of the boxing ring and draws non-injuring offensive punches, letting the opponent tire himself out. This gives the former the opportunity to then execute devastating offensive punches to help them win. The rope-a-dope is most famously associated with Muhammad Ali in his October 1974 Rumble in the Jungle match against world heavyweight champion George Foreman in Kinshasa, Zaire.

Technique 
The rope-a-dope is performed by a boxer assuming a protected stance (in Ali's classic pose, pretending to be trapped and lying against the ropes, which allows some of the punch's energy to be absorbed by the ropes' elasticity rather than the boxer's body). The boxer keeps their guard up and is prepared for the incoming blows while looking for opportunities to counter punch their opponent, who by mounting an offensive may have left themselves open to counters. By being in a defensive posture and being prepared for the incoming blows, the boxer decreases their chances of being caught with a clean flush blow, as ideally a significant portion of the punches will land on the boxer's hands and arms, or will miss completely as a result of the boxer slipping the punch. Additionally, if the opponent lacks stamina, their power will decrease throughout the fight and essentially "waste" many punches into the boxer's guard.

However, a boxer employing this tactic must have a strong chin, or capacity to withstand punishment and thus avoid being knocked down by those punches that do get through the boxer's defenses and land. Offensively, the boxer employing this tactic will look to exploit mistakes made in their opponent's attack by countering if the opponent has left himself or herself open. They will also look to mount short bursts of offensive attacks in between their opponent's attack, being sure to immediately get back in their defensive posture as to not leave themselves open to a counterattack.

Etymology 
According to photographer George Kalinsky, Ali had an unusual way of conducting his sparring sessions, where he had his sparring partner hit him, which he felt "was his way of being able to take punishment in the belly". Kalinsky told him: "Do what you do in a training session: Act like a dope on the ropes." Ali then replied: "So, you want me to be a rope-a-dope?"

According to Angelo Dundee, Kalinsky told Ali: "Why don't you try something like that? Sort of a dope on the ropes, letting Foreman swing away but, like in the picture, hit nothing but air." The publicist John Condon popularized the phrase "rope-a-dope".

Notable fights 
The maneuver is most commonly associated with the match between Muhammad Ali and George Foreman, known as "The Rumble in the Jungle". Foreman was considered by many observers to be the favorite to win the fight due to his superior punching power. Ali purposely angered Foreman during the match, provoking Foreman to attack and force him back on the ropes. Some observers at the time thought that Ali was being horribly beaten and worried that they might see him get killed in the ring. Writer George Plimpton described Ali's stance as like "a man leaning out his window trying to see something on his roof." Far from being brutalized, however, Ali was relatively protected from Foreman's blows. Norman Mailer described the advantage of Ali's rope-a-dope this way: "Standing on one's feet it is painful to absorb a heavy body punch even when blocked with one's arm. The torso, the legs, and the spine take the shock. Leaning on the ropes, however, Ali can pass it along; the rope will receive the strain." Ali's preparation for the fight, which involved toughening himself up by allowing his sparring partners to pummel him, contributed to observers' sense that Ali was outmatched. But Ali took advantage and won the match when Foreman became tired from the punches he was delivering.

Manny Pacquiao used the strategy to gauge the power of welterweight titlist Miguel Cotto in their November 2009 fight. Pacquiao followed the rope-a-dope with a knockdown.

Nicolino Locche, an Argentine boxer nicknamed "El Intocable" (The Untouchable), used this technique extensively throughout his career. He would get against the ropes and dodge nearly every single punch until his opponent would tire, then he would take him down with combinations.

"Irish" Micky Ward used this strategy during many of the fights in the latter part of his career. Ward would wait for his opponent to become fatigued and would hit with either a left hook to the body or other combinations. This strategy led him to the junior welterweight championship of the WBU, where he took the belt from Shea Neary.

Floyd Mayweather Jr. often used this technique in his bouts, as he demonstrated in his August 2017 fight against Conor McGregor.

See also 
Boxing styles and technique

References

Further reading 
 

Boxing terminology
Muhammad Ali